Dubris Valley is a narrow ice-free valley just east of Danum Platform in the northern Britannia Range. It was named in association with Britannia by a University of Waikato geological party, 1978–79, led by Michael Selby. Dubris is a historical name used in Roman Britain for a stream at Dover.

External links 

 Dubris Valley on USGS website
 Dubris Valley on AADC website
 Dubris Valley on SCAR website
 Satellite image of the Dubris Valley area
 Dubris Valley area map
 Dubris Valley image on Antarctica New Zealand Digital Asset Manager website

References 

Valleys of Oates Land